Hare-Breadth Hurry is a 1963 Warner Bros. Looney Tunes cartoon directed by Chuck Jones and Maurice Noble. The short was released on June 8, 1963, and stars Bugs Bunny and Wile E. Coyote. This is the fifth and final pairing of Bugs and the Coyote, and unlike the previous four outings, this cartoon follows the Wile E. Coyote and the Road Runner formula (substituting Bugs for the Road Runner). While Wile E. Coyote is silent, Bugs speaks often to the audience. Hare-Breadth Hurry is also one of the few cartoons where Bugs does not eat a carrot, although Wile E. does use carrots as bait.

Plot

The cartoon Looney Tunes opens in typical Wile E. Coyote and Road Runner fashion. A high-speed object (from which emanates the Road Runner's "beep beep") zooms through the desert, pursued by the coyote. When it stops, it is revealed to be Bugs Bunny, who explains that he is "standing in" because the Road Runner has sprained a giblet cornering a sharp curve. As Wile E. catches up, Bugs takes off again, and, at the point where the Road Runner would "put on that tiny, little extra burst of speed," he downs a couple of "Acme Super Speed Pills". These, he explains, assist him in imitating the Road Runner's speed, and "as long as they hold up, I'm all right". At that moment, the pills wear off, and Bugs' running ability conks out.

Now forced to use his wits as the coyote is closing in on him, Bugs draws a chalk line across the road and holds up his hand meaning "STOP!" The coyote does stop at the line; then, a few feet away, Bugs draws a second line and again holds up his hand. The coyote, however, steps over that first line ;the entire segment of road between the two lines breaks away and drops into an underground river.

The coyote then decides to 'go fishing' for Bugs by using a carrot as bait and dangling it over a cliff. He gets a bite and reels up a huge fish, that swallows all of him but his feet.

After that, Bugs watches in wonderment ("It's amazing the trouble this joker goes through to get a square meal, uh, case in point...") as the coyote sets up a catapult. Wile E. uses a rifle to shoot apart the rope holding the rock meant to fall and cause him to be propelled across the gap between himself and Bugs. Instead, he is propelled straight into the rock. The rifle falls, goes off, and sends the coyote into the air.

Bugs runs again because, "It's only sporting to give him a running shot at me once...in a while." Wile E. sets up with a rifle to take a shot as Bugs tears by, but the gun is muted and does not fire. The coyote steps out to discover a hastily-rigged maze of pipes attached to the rifle barrel. He follows the pipes to the inevitable end where the bullet he fired exits the final attachment, straight into his face.

At the sight of a carrot placed strategically in the road (as a trap similar to one using bird seed in an attempt to ambush the Road Runner), Bugs stops running. He is standing on a bull's-eye target; from above, the coyote drops an anvil. Suddenly, Bugs is there on the cliff, and he places the bull's-eye target over the coyote. The anvil falls from the sky onto Wile E.'s head, dislodging the cliff's edge. The anvil remains behind, sitting on the bull's-eye target Bugs still holds, as the coyote falls to the ground below. Bugs then yanks the target. The anvil falls; the coyote pulls out a miniature umbrella in a sad attempt to protect himself - but the anvil misses him. Relieved, Wile E. strolls out onto the road, where he is run over by a passing truck.

Running once more, Bugs takes note of Wile E.'s next ploy ("Here we go again. He doesn't give up easy, does he?") which is the "Coyote cannonball". As Bugs rips past, the coyote is inside the cannon and ready to launch, but his weight takes the barrel down, resulting in him being shot into the road and creating a crater.

Bugs now waits in the road, checking the time on a stopwatch and remarking, "Yep. Here comes the old 5:15 now. Right on time." The coyote is engaged in a full-throttle effort to run down his prey. At the last second, he sees that Bugs has poured a huge amount of Acme glue onto the road. Wile E. 'puts on the brakes' but cannot stop. He gets stuck but is in perpetual forward movement. There is a phone booth ahead; the phone rings and Bugs dashes to answer it. Wile E. manages to stretch far enough to grab the frame of the structure. After chatting for a bit, Bugs hands the phone to the coyote, saying, "It's for you." This results in Wile E. springing backwards with such thrust that the glued chunk of road comes away and soars with him, stuck to his feet. Bugs races past to open a door that is set up at the edge of a cliff. As he is sailing through the air, phone to his ear, the coyote hears Bugs say, "Pardon me, but look behind you". As he does, he smashes into a cliff wall. The segment of road crushes him, then cracks into pieces. Back at the open door, Bugs says, "Do you realize he almost hit this door?"

Wile E., having fallen away from the cliff wall, is suspended in the air, but only because Bugs has another phone with a cord that is connected to the coyote's. Bugs 'rings up' Wile E. and, mimicking the phone company, says, "You haven't paid your telephone bill lately, so we're going to have to cut you off. Sorry." Bugs severs the cord and Wile E. becomes a victim of gravity once more.

"The moral is, never get cut off in the middle of a long-distance fall," Bugs says, and chuckles.

See also
 List of American films of 1963

References

External links

 
 

1960s English-language films
1963 animated films
1963 short films
Looney Tunes shorts
Warner Bros. Cartoons animated short films
Short films directed by Chuck Jones
Wile E. Coyote and the Road Runner films
Films directed by Maurice Noble
Films scored by William Lava
Self-reflexive films
Bugs Bunny films
1960s Warner Bros. animated short films
American animated short films
Films about Canis
Animated films about rabbits and hares
American comedy short films